Silver Dollar City is a  amusement park in Stone County, Missouri, near the cities of Branson and Branson West.  The park is located off of Missouri Route 76 on the Indian Point peninsula of Table Rock Lake. Silver Dollar City opened on May 1, 1960. The park is an 1880s-themed experience. Silver Dollar City's operating season runs from March until December, with the park closed for two months. Silver Dollar City is owned by Herschend Family Entertainment.

History

Marvel Cave

Silver Dollar City is situated at the site of one of the Ozarks' oldest attractions, Marvel Cave. Henry T. Blow, a lead mining magnate, explored the cave with six miners. They found no lead, but were convinced that the flat ceiling of one room was composed of marble, they originally named the cave Marble Cave. The cave remained undisturbed until 1882 when a group led by T. Hodges Jones and Truman S. Powell entered the cave in hopes of finding lead. Jones and Powell instead found huge amounts of guano and a flat wall which they also believed to be marble. Two years later Jones bought the property and formed the Marble Cave Mining and Manufacturing Company. The company planned a town, Marble City, on the rough hilltop near the cave and in 1884 recorded a plat map at the courthouse in Galena, Missouri. By 1889 much of the guano had been mined from the cave, the marble wall proved to be limestone, and no lead ore was found. The mining company ceased operation.

In 1889, William Henry Lynch, a Canadian miner and dairyman, purchased the cave and a square mile around it for $10,000. Lynch, with the aid of his family, proposed to open the cave to sightseers. The Lynches began operation of the sightseeing venture on October 18, 1894. The venture was not immediately profitable and was closed until Lynch raised additional capital to reopen the cave sometime after 1900. The cave has remained open since, making it one of the oldest continuously running tourist attractions in the Ozarks.

Herschend family
When William Lynch died in 1927, ownership of the cave passed to his daughters and the name of the cave was changed to Marvel Cave. The Lynch family operated the cave for nearly fifty years until a Chicago vacuum cleaner salesman, Hugo Herschend, purchased a 99-year lease on the cave in April 1950.

After Hugo's death in 1955, his wife, Mary, took over the day-to-day operations of the venture.

Once the railway was in operation the Herschends felt the development of the cave was complete, so they decided to create another attraction which would bring even more tourists to the cave.

New theme park
Mary, Jack and Peter began building the 1880s Ozark village. Mary wanted authenticity and preservation as well as preserving the natural beauty of the area. The Herschends built the Ozark frontier town on the land surrounding the site of the cave. Silver Dollar City originally was the site of five shops, a church, a log cabin, and a street production reproducing the feud between the Hatfields and McCoys several times daily.

The name was inspired by Ozark Jubilee script writer and publicist Don Richardson after the promotional idea of giving visitors silver dollars in change. The scenic designer for much of the original attraction was Andy Miller, who had been the set designer for the Jubilee in nearby Springfield. Opening day, May 1, 1960, included an appearance by Uncle Cyp and Aunt Sap Brasfield. In its first year, Silver Dollar City drew more than 125,000 people, four times more visitors than the number that toured Marvel Cave. "We discovered we were in the theme park business," Pete Herschend said.

In 1968, the park started charging admission.

In 1972 Genevieve Lynch, the last of William Lynch's daughters, died and she bequeathed the land under Silver Dollar City and Marvel Cave to the College of the Ozarks and Branson Presbyterian Church. The Herschends continue to operate it.

In 1976, the Herschends purchased the Goldrush Junction theme park in Pigeon Forge, Tennessee, which they renamed Silver Dollar City Tennessee. In 1986, the Herschends partnered with Dolly Parton and renamed the park Dollywood.

Silver Dollar City expanded its entertainment over the years by adding attractions such as a stage coach ride, a narrow-gauge steam railroad, interactive activities and various thrill rides. The park is also home to resident craftsmen who can be seen practicing their craft and exhibiting and selling their work to park visitors.

Pop culture
The Clampett family of CBS-TV's The Beverly Hillbillies decided to pay a visit to Silver Dollar City (treated as an actual town, rather than a theme park) to start off the 1969–1970 season. The plotline involved Granny (Irene Ryan) attempting to find a husband for Elly May (Donna Douglas) back in the hills, while Jed (Buddy Ebsen) socialized with hotel clerk Shorty Kellems (Shug Fisher). They visited the blacksmith Shad Heller, soapmaker Granny Ethel Huffman, and woodcarver Peter Engler, and Miss Hathaway (Nancy Kulp) was seen in the Ozark woods. The Hillbillies were from the area surrounding Silver Dollar City and Branson, and references to Jim Owens and his White River float trip business and some Missouri mountain locations were made throughout the show's nine-year run. Five episodes of The Beverly Hillbillies were eventually shot in the park.

The park was featured in the 1992 book The Man Who Loved Clowns.

In 1999, Silver Dollar City was the site for the 14th annual Stihl Timbersports Series Championships. Jason Wynyard became the champion for the third consecutive year.

On July 5, 2007, Silver Dollar City was featured in an episode of the soap opera As the World Turns.

On December 5, 2007, ABC's Good Morning America spotlighted the park’s Christmas festival, “An Old Time Christmas,” and declared it as one of the top five holiday events in the country. The park was featured as part of the show’s segment called “Good Morning America Lights Up the Holidays.”

From June 21–23, 2009, the park hosted the American Coaster Enthusiasts' national summer convention.

Layout, attractions and general information

Districts
Silver Dollar City is divided into eleven districts.

 Park Entrance
 Main Street
 Homestead Ridge
 Midtown
 Valley Road
 The Grand Exposition
 Riverfront
 Rivertown
 Wilson's Farm
 Hugo’s Hill Street
 Fireman's Landing

Demonstrations
 Brown's Candy Factory
 Carrie's Candles
 Duplicating Lathe
 Hazel's Blown & Cut Glass
 Heartland Home Furnishings 
 Hillcreek Pottery
 Mountain Leather
 Mountain Outfitter's Knives
 Sullivan's Mill
 Valley Road Woodcarvers
 Wilderness Road Blacksmith

Recurring shows

 Horsecreek Band
 Old-Time Story Time
 Pure Heart
 The Homestead Pickers
 Saloon

Rides and attractions

Roller coasters

Rides

Other attractions

 Birdle's Cabin - An authentic log cabin with displays about pioneer life.
 Elsie the Milk Cow – A fake cow with udders that allows guests to pull and retrieve their own "milk".
 Half Dollar Holler – A kids' play and ride area.
 Homestead Animal Barnyard – A petting zoo with animals such as goats, chickens, hens, and other farm animals.
 Marvel Cave – The cave offers two types of tours. The Traditional Cave Tour is a one-hour guided tour through a half mile of lighted passageway. Throughout the tour, geological and historical information is explained. The Lantern Light Tour is a one and a half-hour guided tour through a little over a half mile of unlit passageway. A narrow gauge funicular railway is employed to take visitors from the far end of the cave back to surface level.
 McHaffie's Homestead – A real, hewn-log cabin built in 1843.
 Oak Trail School – A 19th-century school house where everyone is invited to pick a desk, sit down and learn about school in the 1800s.
 Swinging Bridge
 Wilderness Church – An old-time church with a view of the Ozark and Boston Mountains of Arkansas. Services are held on Sundays.
 Case Traction Engine - A 1915 propane-fired steam traction engine that executes sawmill operations, typically during the Harvest Festival.

Former rides and attractions
Sam’s Minin’ Shack – Closed in 1968 and re-themed as Grandfather's Mansion.
Buzz Saw Falls – This was a roller coaster that incorporated a water type boat for the vehicle. The ride opened in 1999 and was largely promoted, however it was constantly plagued with mechanical difficulties. It was closed in 2003 and construction began to modify the ride into the current Powder Keg: A Blast in the Wilderness, which opened in 2005.
Rube Dugan's Diving Bell – This was an attraction that simulated a Jules Verne-style fantasy submarine ride, the first simulation ride of its kind. Disney Imagineers told Silver Dollar City that it would be hard to do but secretly advised them on how to create the attraction. It was removed in the mid-1980s to make room for the Lost River of the Ozarks, a ride that could run more people through per hour. Slim Pickens was the voice of Rube Dugan.
 Lost River of the Ozarks – This ride was a whitewater rapids adventure using 6-person inner tube shaped boats.  Signage cautioned riders that they would get "bathtub wet."  It was constructed on the former site of Rube Dugan's Diving Bell.  The Lost River of the Ozarks opened May 4, 1985 at a cost of $2 million and was demolished following the 2018 season. This ride has been replaced by a new river rapids ride called Mystic River Falls, which officially opened to the public on July 21, 2020.
Jim Owens Float Trip – This was an outdoor boat ride (1969 to 1980) around a man-made river with animatronics. Silver Dollar City removed this ride after the 1980 season and remodeled it into the American Plunge log flume. However, the original channels still exist and can be seen as guests make their way to Wildfire and from the queue line for American Plunge.
Stagecoach – In the early years of the park, an authentic stagecoach took guests on a bumpy ride around the perimeter of the town square pulled by sturdy draft horses. It was removed five years after the park opened.
Runaway Ore Cart – This was a small children's roller coaster that was removed after the 2004 season.
Tom Sawyer's Landing – Added to the park in 1984, this play area featured rope towers and rides with Becky's Carousel as its center piece. Silver Dollar City's craftsmen hand carved each horse on the carousel. The most notable aspect of the structure were the large rope nets upon which visitors bounced and climbed.
Huck Finn's Hideaway – This was a large playhouse built several stories above the ground on stilts. Visitors entered the attraction via a tiny spiral staircase built into a fake hollow tree. They had to crawl on hands and knees across a narrow bridge from the top of the hollow tree to the tree house. The exit from the attraction led visitors through an artificial cave featuring an infinite mirror illusion and Christmas lights to make it appear that they were walking through a large open space with "stars".
 Waterworks Waterboggan – A flume-type water ride, mostly through a dark tunnel so the sudden turns took riders by surprise.
 Splash Harbor – was located near the bathrooms of Geyser Gulch.
 Geyser Gulch – This was an area built in 1997 with two large buildings. Kids could run throughout the building located by the "lake" and shoot each other with water guns, while dodging balls being thrown by other kids or through tubes. There were also water sprinklers outside the building where children can run through. Geyser Gulch closed permanently on August 3, 2014 to make way for Fireman's Landing, which opened the following year in 2015.

Festivals
Throughout the operating season Silver Dollar City hosts eight different festivals:

Street Fest (April): A spring festival showcasing unique and colorful entertainment in the streets of SDC, featuring new culinary creations.
Bluegrass & BBQ Festival (May): A celebration of bluegrass music and BBQ from across the nation.
National Kids Fest (June–July)- A summer festival featuring shows, activities, and treats that appeal to families with children.
Moonlight Madness (July – August): Ride all day and into the night on over 40 thrilling rides & attractions as you enjoy over 12 straight hours of nonstop fun for 16 straight days! 
Southern Gospel Picnic (August – September): Gospel music is showcased during this festival along with picnic style dinners
Country Music Days (September): Enjoy 13 days of concerts featuring classic country stars, plus Saturday night celebrity concerts in Echo Hollow® Amphitheatre .
National Harvest & Pumpkin Nights (September – October): A salute to an old time harvest celebration featuring visiting craftsmen.
An Old Time Christmas (November – December): A traditional holiday Christmas celebration with special shows, foods, and other attractions. In addition, the park is decorated with 6.5 million Christmas lights and a five-story special effects Christmas tree.

Former festivals
Throughout its operation, Silver Dollar City has hosted different festivals that have since been replaced.
Festival of Wonder (April): Replaced by Street Fest
Family Fest – Replaced by Star-Spangled Summer in 2014.
Star Spangled Summer- Replaced by National Kids Fest in 2022
World-Fest (April – May) - An international event showcasing different cultures and performers from around the world; replaced by Festival of Wonder.
Spring National Crafts Festival (New in 1977) - Featuring fine furniture, stained glass, calligraphy, and macrame.

Stages, multipurpose buildings and theaters
 The Gazebo
 Carousel Barn
 Dockside Theater
 Riverfront Playhouse – The “Deep Woods” area increased the park's size by 25%. The district eventually introduced the 600 seat Court House Theatre in 1979. The inaugural production was The Chicken Thief, a comedy depicting the trial of a strange man named Melvin. The theatre’s name has changed over the years from Courthouse to Gaslight and on to its current name. Past shows have included Timothy Turnbuckle’s Traveling Time Machine, Hoedown, and Hatfield’s Haint. During the Christmas season, a nativity play of the Nativity of Jesus is given.
 The Frisco Barn
 McHaffie's Homestead Front Porch
 Silver Dollar Saloon – The saloon opened to the public in 1973 with can-can dancers and singing bartenders. Carry Nation brought her temperance union to the City to shut the house of ill repute down for good. Unfortunately for Ms. Nation, she didn't succeed. The show has changed throughout the years to include Mean Murphy, the saloon’s arch enemy; Miss Tilly, the loveable yet dim-witted dance hall girl; and Choctaw Charlie and his Wild West show. The show is billed as “Good clean fun.” There is no cursing, chewing or spitting at the Silver Dollar and root beer is served as an alternative to beer.
 Echo Hollow Amphitheatre is an amphitheatre with seating for 4,000. The amphitheater opened in 1983 as a dinner theatre encouraging guests to stay once Silver Dollar City closed for the day. Featured shows within the amphitheater have included Harmonies from the Hollow, Echo Hollow Jubilee, Hotrods and Hair-dos, and GAC Country Nights. Each spring Silver Dollar City’s Young Christian Youth Rally is held at Echo Hollow. This Rally features ministers, speakers and musical guests like Newsboys, Kutless and Sixpence None the Richer. The amphitheater also hosts nationally known musical artists such as, Gladys Knight, Peter, Paul and Mary, Nitty Gritty Dirt Band and Ricky Skaggs.
 The Boatworks Theater
 The Opera House – The 1,000 seat performance venue opened in 1994 with the Broadway-style production Listen to the River. Since its opening the theatre has played host to other large scale in-house productions including American Spirit,, a patriotic musical; For the Glory, a Civil War drama; Headin’ West, a musical drama about Western expansion; and A Dickens’ Christmas Carol, a high-energy, musical telling of Charles Dickens’ Christmas classic, A Christmas Carol.
 Pickin' Shed
 Red Gold Heritage Hall – To commemorate Silver Dollar City's 40th anniversary this  multipurpose building opened in 2000. Themed after a turn-of-the-century tomato canning factory, the hall is capable of hosting exhibitions and shows with seating up to 1,800 guests. Festival food fills the building during events. Previously, the town of Bethlehem was recreated each Christmas season, but has since been moved to the Riverfront Playhouse in order to accommodate a stage production of It's a Wonderful Life.

See also

List of amusement parks

References

External links

Silver Dollar City (Official Website)
Dollywood (Official Website)

Silver Dollar City
Stone County, Missouri
Amusement parks in Missouri
Amusement parks opened in 1960
1960 establishments in Missouri